Monteverde is an urban zone of the quarter Gianicolense in Rome, Italy.
It is located just outside the Aurelian walls, south of the Janiculum hill and southwest of Trastevere.
Monteverde means green mountain and is named after a hill upon which the zone is located and which is not part of the classical seven hills of Rome.

Overview
Monteverde is usually divided in two parts, Monteverde Vecchio, a mostly early 20th century neighbourhood of stately villas, and Monteverde Nuovo, most of which consists of semi-highrises, constructed in the second half of the 20th century.
It has a large middle-class population.

Monteverde is a residential area outside of Rome's historical centre. The main attraction is Villa Doria Pamphili, which used to be  private property of the Pamphili family, but is now a public park, the largest in Rome.

Monteverde is home to The American University of Rome as well as the American Academy in Rome and its related undergraduate program, the Intercollegiate Center for Classical Studies.

Monteverde was the main base of operations for the Proietti Clan, a criminal organization led by Franco Nicolini and the Proietti brothers, until their destruction in the early 80s at the hands of the Banda della Magliana.

See also
Villa Doria Pamphili
Quattro Venti railway station
The American University of Rome
Santa Maria Regina Pacis a Monte Verde

References

Rome Q. XII Gianicolense